The Arrondissement of Avelgem was a short-lived arrondissement in present-day Belgium. It was created out of the Arrondissement of Kortrijk in 1818, and it already ceased to exist in 1823.

Avelgem